Alex Hennessy (born 23 November 2004) is an English footballer who plays as a midfielder for Charlton Athletic of the FA Women's Championship.

Early life and career 
Hennessy began playing football on a boys' team due to the lack of local girls' team. She had initially become interested in the game after playing football in a resort whilst on holiday with her family, and as a result her mother started looking for a team for Hennessy to join. She cited England international midfielders Jordan Nobbs and Paul Scholes as her footballing heroes. From the age of 11, Hennessy attended the Coopers' Company and Coborn School, a comprehensive school in Havering, England.

Club career 
Coming through the Arsenal academy, Hennessy made her unofficial first-team debut on 1 August 2021 as a 60th-minute substitute against Chelsea in a preseason friendly. She started in a North London Derby friendly match against Tottenham Hotspur a week later and scored twice as Arsenal won 4–0.

Hennessy made her competitive debut on 12 September 2021 in a 4–0 FA Women's Super League win over Reading, playing the final 12 minutes. She was not selected for any subsequent match day squads up to the January transfer window, before joining FA Women's Championship club Crystal Palace on loan for the remainder of the season on 28 January 2022.

Hennessy made her debut for Crystal Palace on 30 January 2022, coming on as a substitute for the last 14 minutes in a 3–1 victory over Lewes. Her first start with Crystal Palace came against Coventry United on 6 March 2022, with the side losing 1–0. She made a total of nine appearances for Crystal Palace including three starts.

In January 2023, joined FA Women's Championship club Charlton Athletic.

International 
Hennessy has represented England at under-15, under-16, under-17 and under-19 level, and has captained her country as a youth international.

References

Living people
2004 births
English women's footballers
Women's association football forwards
Women's Super League players
Women's Championship (England) players
Arsenal W.F.C. players
Crystal Palace F.C. (Women) players
West Ham United F.C. Women players
Charlton Athletic W.F.C. players
England women's youth international footballers